The 9×53mmR rifle cartridge was designed for hunting in the USSR. It is a 7.62×54mmR necked up to accommodate a larger bullet.

History 
It was offered for export to other countries

Since 1971 two bullet types are available:
 Type A - SP for hunting 250–500 kg animals
 Type B - FMJ for hunting 70–250 kg animals

Soviet 9×53mmR cartridges were loaded with smokeless powder VT (винтовочный пироксилиновый порох ВТ), as well as Soviet 5.6×39mm and 7.62×54mmR hunting cartridges

Firearms 
In USSR, several rifles were designed for this cartridge: bolt-action carbine "Los", self-loading carbine "Medved'", combination guns TOZ-55 "Zubr", MTs-7-09, MTs 30, MTs-109-09, MTs-110-09, MTs-111-09 and TOZ-84-12/9,27.

In Russian Federation, several rifles were designed for this cartridge: IZh-94 "Express"; "Berkut-3", "Saiga-9" (it was produced since 2001 until 2005) and VPO-103.

See also
9 mm caliber
List of rifle cartridges

Notes 

This cartridge should not be confused with 9.3×53mmR Finnish which has similar dimensions, but a slightly larger bullet (71.45 mm overall cartridge length) and, more important, higher maximum pressure - 340 MPa.

Sources 
 М. Блюм. Охотничьи патроны к нарезному оружию // журнал "Охота и охотничье хозяйство", № 6, 1973. стр.26-28
 М. М. Блюм, И. Б. Шишкин. Твоё ружьё. М., "Физкультура и спорт", 1989. стр.106
 Патроны охотничьи 9x53 // Охотничье и спортивное оружие. М., Внешторгиздат. 1989.
 А. В. Кузьминский. Оружие для охотника: практическое пособие / под общ. ред. А. Е. Тараса М., ООО «Издательство АСТ», 2002. стр.250-251

References 

Pistol and rifle cartridges
Rimmed cartridges